James Anderson Burns (1865–1945), founder of the Oneida Baptist Institute, grew up as the youngest son of a Primitive Baptist preacher in the hills of West Virginia, where he hunted and sold ginseng roots to buy books so he could attend the first school in a nearby settlement. Eager to see and learn more, as a teenager he visited his father's homestead in Clay County, Kentucky, where he was pulled into the violence of defending family honor. Burns survived four years of feuding; after a close call, he had a religious experience that prompted him to stop fighting and resume his studies.
With the help of the Baptist Education Society he planned to study first at Denison University and then at a theological school. But after only seven months in the cooperative and peaceful academic atmosphere of Denison's Ohio campus, he felt compelled to create a similar opportunity for his people in Kentucky.

After marrying Martha Sizemore in 1897, Burns taught at Burning Springs College in Owsley County, Kentucky, where he met H. L. McMurray, a Baptist preacher from Kansas. McMurray shared Burns' dream of building a Christian school for mountain children and together they planned to make it a reality. They selected a site in Oneida on a small hill where three small streams converge to form the South Fork of the Kentucky River. The  site in Oneida was donated by Martha "Granny" Hogg, and the Oneida Baptist Institute opened on January 1, 1900.

"Burns of the Mountains"

Called "Burns of the Mountains," James Anderson  Burns was born August 2, 1865, in West Virginia. His father, Hugh Burns, a farmer and Primitive Baptist minister, had moved there from Clay County, Kentucky.

After his first wife died, Hugh married Elizabeth Collins. James had three older siblings, Robert, William and Elizabeth. They learned to read from the Bible and an almanac. At night they gathered around the fireside while Hugh read Bible stories and prayed.

He wanted to go, but had no money for books. He spent his summer digging ginseng roots and earned enough money to buy books and his first pair of store-bought shoes.

By age 16 James had completed the school's curriculum, but what he wanted most was to learn about Kentucky. When he asked why they had left, his father told him about the feuds. James felt that his father had left their relatives to fight the battle alone and said, "I'm going to Kentucky." His father made him promise to wait a year. A week later Hugh died from a heart attack. The next year, 1883, James and his mother moved to the old "Burns Homestead" near Oneida.

Soon after Burns arrived in Clay County his only living uncle took him to the family graveyard.  Pointing to the graves, his uncle told him stories of the untimely deaths their relatives had suffered. Burns left with a burning determination to avenge their deaths.
  
For  the  next  four  years,  Burns earned  an  almost  legendary  reputation  in  logging  and  feuding. Then an event occurred that would change the direction of his life.  He  and  several  of  his  relatives  attacked  a  cabin on  Newfound  Creek..  Burns was hit over the head and left for dead. In The Crucible he wrote, "When I regained consciousness...I went to the top of a mountain and spent two days in lonely vigils. On the third day I slept. When I woke up...the urge of vengeance was gone and peace reigned within. I was determined that the feuds should be stopped."

Burns  returned  to  West  Virginia, made  a  public  profession  of  faith  in Christ and was baptized. He began to preach, following in his father's footsteps. The Baptist Education Society encouraged him to go to Dennison University in Granville, Ohio.  After attending Dennison for seven months, Burns returned to Kentucky in 1892.  From 1893 to 1897 he taught in Clay County public schools. During the school year 1897–1898 Burns taught at Berea College, where he met Rev. H.L. McMurray.  They became close friends and Burns told McMurray about the vision God had given him for the children of the Clay County Mountains. McMurray agreed to return with him.

Burns married Martha Sizemore in 1897. They had six children—Myrtle, Dugger, Dixie, Holly, Robert and Marvin.

Perhaps the climax of the Burns saga was the meeting of the clans in the old mill near Oneida. Around 50 men from both sides of the feud gathered to hear   Burns speak about his dream of building a Christian school. He  said,  "We've  been  teaching  our children  to  hate  each  other  for more than  a  hundred  years.  Let's teach them to love each other and then we will have peace. Let's join together to build a school and teach our children the story of our Saviour's love." After several minutes of silence two men, Lee Combs and Frank Burns, from opposite sides of the feud came to the middle of the room and shook hands. At that moment, a school was born.

Burns  and  McMurray  went  up Sandlin  Hill,  climbed  an  oak  tree, looked  down  on  Oneida  and  picked a  site  for  the  school.  The knoll they selected was owned by Martha Coldiron Hogg, who donated the property. Soon after Burns laid the cornerstone, men came from both sides of the feud to help build their school. "Big Henry" Hensley gave fifty dollars and Robert Carnahan gave twenty-five.  Others brought lumber. The men often worked until midnight and slept on shavings. Burns had announced that the school would open on January 1, 1900.   By Christmas they still needed  of lumber. Then Frank Burns crossed the frozen river in his wagon loaded with logs he had removed from the loft of his cabin.  The school opened as planned January 1, 1900.

When the board of trustees met on December 20, 1899, they named the school Mamre Baptist College in Buring Spring Ky and Burns was named the first president. On the opening day of school he read to 100 students—boys, girls, men, and women—Psalm 127:1:  "Except the Lord build the house, they labor in vain that build it..." The school was now in session with three teachers, Burns, McMurray, and C.A. Dugger. Classes ranged from grades one through eight. Tuition was $1.00 a month. Only a few were able to pay cash. Others brought farm animals, produce or coal dug on the family farm.
 
In  the  spring  of  1900 Dr. Carter Jones  invited  Burns  to  speak  to  the State  Board  of  Missions  meeting  in Louisville. As a result, Broadway Baptist Church pledged to send $70 a month to the school. When Dr. Jones invited Burns  to  Louisville  in  1901  to meet with Dr. and Mrs. J. B. Marvin, Burns  told  them about  the need  for a larger  building.  A few days later Dr. and Mrs. Marvin sent $5,000. The new building was completed in 1902 and named Marvin Hall in their honor.

As the enrollment grew, Burns turned students away because they could not find lodging in nearby homes. In 1905 he arranged to start the construction of a girls' dormitory while he raised the money. He made the rounds across the state to any church that would listen to his story. Burns said in The Crucible, "Somehow the payrolls were always met. Bob Carnahan took care of any overdrafts.  In due time Carnahan Hall was completed and a home for 50 girls was provided."

In 1908 Oneida Baptist Institute (the name had been changed in 1904) had its first graduation. Five men received high school diplomas.  The teachers had studied at night in order to teach them during the day. All five went to Georgetown College, where they were put in the sophomore class.

After hearing Burns speak in New York City, Elizabeth Anderson gave $5,300 to buy a farm. A year later in 1911, Anderson donated $11,000 for the construction of Anderson Hall.

An article, "Burns of the Mountains" written by Emerson Hough, appeared in American Magazine in 1912. Hough told how Burns had stopped the feuds and built a school for the mountain children in Clay County.  Speaking invitations came from everywhere. The Chautauqua and Lyceum Lecture Bureaus offered to pay Burns a salary, railroad fare and expenses. Burns delivered over 4,000 lectures in almost every state. Listeners were captivated, and many gave donations.
 
In October 1920 Burns suffered a mental and physical breakdown due to overwork and complications from influenza.  Thomas Adams had served as Associate President since 1917 and was named president in 1921.  The school was in major financial trouble. Neither Adams nor the teachers had received salaries for over a year when Adams resigned in January 1922.

Sylvia Russell was named president in April 1922. With the help of Charles Goins, Russell was able to bring the school out of financial crisis. Burns resumed his lecture tours in June 1923. He met his second wife, Margaret Benner, on a tour.  They were married February 14, 1925 and James Benner Burns was born November 19, 1926.

Mrs.  Russell  led  a  campaign  to raise  funds  to  build  a  home  for  the Burns'  family.  The  new  house  was constructed on the hill overlooking the campus  where  Burns  and McMurray had  selected  the  site  for  the  school. Russell  resigned  in  1928  and  Burns served a second term, 1928–1934.

After James Anderson Burns  retired  in 1934, he moved  to Anderson Hall. When he died, the following note was sent  to his  friends all across  the USA:  "At  4:00  p.m.  September 12, 1945,  the  forty-seventh year of Oneida Baptist Institute,  James Anderson Burns, Founder, Builder, and President Emeritus, died in his room in Anderson Hall. The final services were in  the  school  chapel  on Friday  afternoon  with  a  great  funeral  oration  by Dr. Elmer Gabbard, President of Witherspoon College, Buckhorn, Kentucky. Burial was on Cemetery Hill in Oneida, overlooking the buildings and grounds of  the  institution  into  which  went  his life  and  through  which  he  forever lives."

References
 Burns, James Anderson. The Crucible: A Tale of the Kentucky Feuds. Oneida, Kentucky: The Oneida Institute, 1928.
 "'Commercialism' in the Mountains." Courier-Journal, Louisville, Kentucky, June 15, 1913.
 Hough, Emerson. "Burns of the Mountains." The American Magazine, December, 1912.
 "Letting Light into Kentucky Mountains." Courier-Journal, Louisville, Kentucky, June 8, 1913.
 The Oneida Mountaineer, Oneida, Kentucky, May 15, 1916.
 The Oneida Mountaineer, Oneida, Kentucky, Vol. 61 No. 2, October, 1981.
 Richardson, Darrell C. Mountain Rising. Oneida, Kentucky: Oneida Mountaineer Press, 1986.
 Thomas, Samuel W. Dawn Comes to the Mountains. Louisville, Ky.: George Rogers Clark Press, 1981.
 Thomas, Samuel W. "The Oneida Albums: Photography, Oral Tradition, and the Appalachian Experience." The Register of the Kentucky Historical Society, 80, no. 4 (Autumn, 1982): 432-443.
 White, Ann McNielly. "A Miracle of the Mountains." Courier-Journal, Louisville, Kentucky, March 2, 1913.
 Alumni News, Oneida, Kentucky, Vol. 4 No. 2, March, 2010.

External links
 Claude C. Matlack Collection, University of Louisville Libraries

Baptists from West Virginia
1865 births
1945 deaths
School founders
20th-century American educators
Baptists from Kentucky
19th-century American educators
Denison University alumni
Baptist ministers from the United States